Guiyang International Financial Center is a skyscraper complex in Guiyang, China. The complex was completed in 2020.

References 

Skyscrapers in Guiyang